The 1875–76 Home Nations rugby union matches are a series of international friendlies held between the England, Ireland and Scotland national rugby union teams. These were the last international rugby games to field teams of twenty players a side, the teams reducing to fifteen a side in the 1876–77 season.

Results

Scoring system
The matches for this season were decided on goals scored. A goal was awarded for a successful conversion after a try, for a dropped goal or for a goal from mark. If a game was drawn, any unconverted tries were tallied to give a winner. If there was still no clear winner, the match was declared a draw.

The matches

Ireland vs. England

Ireland: RB Walkington (NIFC), H Moore (Windsor), BN Casement (Wanderers), EW Hobson (Dublin University), RJ Bell (NIFC) capt., AP Cronyn (Dublin University), G Andrews (NIFC), DT Arnott (Lansdowne), WH Ash (NIFC), HL Cox (Lansdowne), WA Cuscaden (Bray), W Finlay (Windsor), R Galbraith (Dublin University), R Greer (Kingstown), J Ireland (Windsor), JA McDonald (Methodist College), RM Maginess (Dublin University), EN McIlwaine (NIFC), HD Walsh (Dublin University), AJ Westby (Dublin University)

England: SHM Login (Royal Naval College), Alec Pearson (Blackheath), CR Gunner (Marlborough Nomads), AT Michell (Oxford University), CWH Clark (Liverpool), WE Collins (St George's Hospital), J V Brewer (Gipsies), CC Bryden (Clapham Rovers), Andrew Bulteel (Manchester), James Bush (Clifton), HJ Graham (Wimbledon Hornets), JDG Graham (Wimbledon Hornets), W Greg (Manchester), WHH Hutchinson (Hull), Edward Kewley (Liverpool), Francis Luscombe (Gipsies) capt., EE Marriott (Manchester), Murray Marshall (Blackheath), Edward Beadon Turner (St George's Hospital), CL Verelst (Liverpool)

England vs. Scotland

England: Alec Pearson (Blackheath), AH Heath (Oxford University), Reg Birkett (Clapham Rovers), L Stokes (Blackheath), TS Tetley (Bradford), WE Collins (St George's Hospital), WC Hutchinson (RIE College), FR Adams (Richmond), James Bush (Clifton), EC Cheston (Richmond), HJ Graham (Wimbledon Hornets), W Greg (Manchester), WH Hunt (Preston Grasshoppers), Edward Kewley (Liverpool), Francis Luscombe (Gipsies) capt., Murray Marshall (Blackheath), WCW Rawlinson (Blackheath), GR Turner (St George's Hospital), Roger Walker (Manchester)

Scotland: JS Carrick (Glasgow Academicals), T Chalmers (Glasgow Academicals), Malcolm Cross (Glasgow Academicals), Ninian Finlay (Edinburgh Academicals), AK Stewart (Edinburgh University RFC), GQ Paterson (Edinburgh Academicals), DH Watson (Glasgow Academicals), Allan Arthur (Glasgow Academicals), WH Bolton (West of Scotland), NT Brewis (Edinburgh Inst FP), CW Cathcart (Edinburgh University RFC), Daniel Drew (Glasgow Academicals), George Raphael Fleming (Glasgow Academicals), JHS Graham (Edinburgh Academicals), RW Irvine  (Edinburgh Academicals) capt., JE Junor (Glasgow Academicals), D Lang (Paisley), AG Petrie (Royal HSFP), J Reid (Edinburgh Wanderers), Charles Villar (Edinburgh Wanderers)

Bibliography

References

History of rugby union matches between England and Scotland
History of rugby union matches between England and Ireland
England national rugby union team matches
Scotland national rugby union team matches
Ireland national rugby union team matches
1875–76 in British rugby union
1875 in English sport
1876 in English sport
1876 in Scottish sport
rugby union